The Kazakhstan women's national under-18 basketball team is administered by the Kazakhstan Basketball Federation.
It represents the country in international under-18 (under age 18) women's basketball competitions.

See also
Kazakhstan women's national basketball team
Kazakhstan women's national under-16 basketball team
Kazakhstan men's national under-19 basketball team

References

External links
 Archived records of Kazakhstan team participations

under
Women's national under-18 basketball teams